In Igboland, there are different festivities that are celebrated, but the most influential of all include the masquerade festival and the New Yam Festival.

Masquerades are revered as superior beings in Igbo culture. A masquerade must be treated with respect when seen in open places because it is thought that they represent both the spirit and human worlds. Another widely held belief is that the masquerades are considered to be higher than humans because they emerge from the soil. Only men participate in masquerading whose identity is maintained a well-guarded secret.

List of masquerades in Igboland 

 Adamma

Adamma masquerade is  a contemporary maiden spirit mask worn by men. Adamma, which means "beautiful woman" and is usually presented to a family's first female child, is the name of the ceremonial masquerade. People frequently question whether the man wearing the mask is indeed a man because she constantly looks stunning in colorful attire and dances so smoothly.

 Mkpamkpanku

There are many masculine aspects in this masquerade, which is quite stern.     They are typically well-known in their own right, swift, aggressive, and nimble. Due to the fact that they are active masquerades, they are primarily worn by teens. Two or more powerful men must surround the masquerade at all times, and a rope must be wrapped around its waist to prevent it from overacting.

 Ojionu

Unique to the Agbaja people of Enugu state, the Odo is a masquerade (Ngwo and environs). 

The Odo masquerade typically symbolizes a deity who, according to myth and tradition, permits communication between the living and the dead. 

During the Odo celebration, it is said that the appearance of this masquerade allows the dead to openly interact with the living.

 Ijele

The Ijele masquerade, which originated in the Old Anambra state, is the largest mask ritual in recorded history. 45 different masquerades have previously performed on top of Ijele, the King of All Masquerades. These 45 masquerades are currently represented by the statues atop Ijele.

It is the pinnacle of all masquerades, and it typically takes place last. Many communities in South-East Nigeria have the Ijele brought to them in order to symbolize fertility and a plentiful harvest. It also shows up at important events like weddings, memorial services, and other celebrations.

 Izaga

The Izaga masquerade, which is the tallest of all Igbo masquerades, is often considered a humorous or show-off masquerade. Both shorter and taller growth is a possibility for them. They only appear at customary rites or festivals to appease the audience.

Significance of Masquerades in Igboland 
Masquerades played significant roles in maintaining law and order in the past, particularly before the arrival of Christianity. Young people were trained to regard masquerades as sacred. To avoid the wrath of Masquerades, people were obligated to always tell the truth. Masquerades were seen as a way to keep the peace and maintain social order in this context. They served largely as objective law enforcement personnel. The ceremonial of vibrant and beautiful masquerades is typically attended by the entire village during festivals. Masquerades serve as entertainment, but they also combine dance, acrobatics, and other extraordinary feats to astound both locals and visitors who are unsure of their abilities. A severe masquerade may sometimes occasionally approach a people to rebuke them of their evil acts especially coveting someone's wife, significant crimes like poisoning someone, or other perceived misbehaviors to society. Despite how outdated this technique may appear, it was quite successful in imposing corrective measures on many would-be social outcasts. As a result, the community's established norms and values were retained without being flouted on the basis of political or economic influence. Masquerades had no respect for people because they were thought to be spirits. Everyone in society was paying attention.

References

External links 
 Exhibition of Igbo masquerades

Igbo culture